Miloš Veljković (born 26 September 1995) is a professional footballer who plays as a centre-back for Werder Bremen. Born in Switzerland, he represents Serbia at international level.

Club career

Early career
Born in Basel in Switzerland to Serbian parents, Veljković started his professional footballing career at Swiss side FC Basel.

Tottenham Hotspur
Miloš Veljković joined Tottenham Hotspur in 2011 from FC Basel. He made his Premier League debut on 8 April 2014 against Sunderland in a 5–1 home win, replacing Paulinho after 88 minutes. He got a longer run out on 11 May against Aston Villa when he came on for Sandro in the 62nd minute.

Veljković went on loan to Middlesbrough in the Championship on 16 October 2014 for three months. Due to the form of the midfield duo of Grant Leadbitter and Adam Clayton in central midfield, he was limited to a few substitute appearances and his loan was not extended in January.

On 20 January 2015, Veljković joined Charlton Athletic on loan until the end of the season. However, he picked a shoulder injury in his third match for Charlton which ruled him out of contention.

Werder Bremen
Veljković joined Werder Bremen on 1 February 2016, signing a three and half year deal, for a reported fee of €300,000. On 24 September 2016, he made his first appearance for the first team of the 2016–17 season in a 2–1 victory against VfL Wolfsburg on matchday 5, the club's first win of the season; he played the full 90 minutes as centre-back after Lamine Sané had dropped out with knee problems in the warmup to the match.

He agreed a contract extension with the club in June 2018.

in June 2022, after Werder Bremen's return to the Bundesliga in the 2021–22 season, Veljković signed another contract extension with the club, reportedly until 2025.

International career
Veljković was born in Switzerland to Serbian parents, he initially represented Switzerland U16's before pledging his allegiance to Serbia. He played for the Serbia U19 team which won the 2013 UEFA European Under-19 Championship. In the summer of 2015, he also won the FIFA U-20 World Cup for Serbia U20's as part of a Golden Generation coming through for the Serbia national team. Veljković played every game as centre back.

He made his debut for the Serbia national team on 11 November 2017 in a friendly match against China. 

In June 2018, he was included in the final 23-man squad for the 2018 FIFA World Cup, where he appeared in the match against Brazil.

In November 2022, he was selected in Serbia's squad for the 2022 FIFA World Cup in Qatar. He played in all three group stage matches, against Brazil, Cameroon, and Switzerland. Serbia finished fourth in the group.

Style of play
Veljković has played both as centre back and as a defensive midfielder. He revealed that he prefers to play as a defensive midfielder in club football, and prefers to play as a centre back during international football.

Career statistics

Club

International

Honours
Serbia
 UEFA Under-19 Championship: 2013
 FIFA U-20 World Cup: 2015

Individual
 UEFA European Under-19 Championship Team of the Tournament: 2013

References

External links
 
 

1995 births
Living people
Swiss people of Serbian descent
Footballers from Basel
Swiss men's footballers
Serbian footballers
Association football central defenders
Serbia international footballers
Serbia youth international footballers
Switzerland youth international footballers
Serbia under-21 international footballers
2018 FIFA World Cup players
2022 FIFA World Cup players
Tottenham Hotspur F.C. players
Middlesbrough F.C. players
Charlton Athletic F.C. players
SV Werder Bremen players
Premier League players
English Football League players
Bundesliga players
2. Bundesliga players
3. Liga players
Swiss expatriate footballers
Serbian expatriate footballers
Serbian expatriate sportspeople in England
Expatriate footballers in England
Serbian expatriate sportspeople in Germany
Expatriate footballers in Germany